Krishna Dev Tripathi was  an Indian politician.  He was elected to the Lok Sabha, the lower house of the Parliament of India from the Unnao constituency of Uttar Pradesh as a member of the Indian National Congress.

References

External links
Official Biographical Sketch in Lok Sabha Website

Indian National Congress politicians
1930 births
Possibly living people
India MPs 1962–1967